This is a list of the silk, cotton and other textile mills in Cheshire, England. The first mills were built in the 1760s, in Styal by Samuel Greg using the Arkwright system and were powered by the water of the River Bollin. There were significant early cotton mills; Cheshire was an important centre of the silk industry. Parts of Cheshire have been subsumed into Stockport and Tameside.

River Bollin

Styal

Macclesfield

River Dean

Bollington
The Swindells family dominated cotton spinning in Bollington. They operated or owned Ingersley Vale Mill from 1821, Rainow Mill from 1822 both until 1841. They built the Clarence Mill with their partners the Brooke family in 1834, and extended it in 1841, 1854 and 1877. Thomas Oliver & Sons were at the Higher and Lower Mill from 1832 until 1859 and at the Waterhouse Mill from 1841. The Greg family from Quarry Bank Mill and later Reddish leased the Lower House Mill in 1832. The Swindells went on to build the Adelphi Mill in 1856.

Rainow

River Dane

Congleton
Congleton had England's third oldest silk-throwing mill and spun both cotton and silk. Its prosperity depended on tariffs imposed on imported silk. When the tariffs were removed in the 1860s, the empty mills moved over to fustian cutting. A limited silk ribbon weaving industry survived into the 20th century, and woven labels were still being produced to the 1990s. Many mills survive, as industrial or units.

Kettleshulme

Knutsford

Warrington

Prestbury

See also

List of mills in Longdendale and Glossopdale
List of mills in Stockport
Silk industry of Cheshire

References

Bibliography

External links
 

 
Cheshire
Cotton industry in England
Lists of buildings and structures in Cheshire